The Schwarzwasser (in German) or Černá (in Czech) is a river in Germany and the Czech Republic. The name means 'black'. It is a right tributary of the Zwickauer Mulde in the German state of Saxony. It flows through Schwarzenberg.

Gallery

See also 
List of rivers of Saxony
List of rivers of the Czech Republic

References

External links 
 

Rivers of the Karlovy Vary Region
Rivers of Saxony
Rivers of the Ore Mountains
Johanngeorgenstadt
Rivers of Germany
International rivers of Europe